This is a list of notable buildings and structures in Benin:

Cotonou and suburbs

Hospitals

Hotels
Benin Marina

Markets
Dantokpa Market

Places of worship
Cotonou Cathedral
Cotonou Central Mosque

Universities and education
National University of Benin

Other
Ancien Pont Bridge
Cotonou Friendship Stadium

Parakou
Musée en Plein Air de Parakou

Porto-Novo
King Toffa's Palace
Porto Novo Museum of Ethnography

References